Sophie Teboul (born 6 January 1976) is a French classical pianist.

Training 
Born in Nice (Alpes-Maritimes), Teboul began studying piano at the Conservatory of Nice and then at the age of 14 joined the conservatoire de Paris in Jacques Rouvier's class for piano and Christian Ivaldi's one for chamber music. She obtained a first prize in piano and two first prizes in chamber music as well as a national diploma in higher music studies.

There, she pursued a development cycle and worked with Dmitri Bashkirov, Christian Zacharias and Maria Curcio.

She won the Radio France competition at the age of 14, as well as the international piano competitions of Vercelli (Italy) and Alexandro Casagrande at Terni (Italy).

Career

Teaching 
Since 2001, she has been teaching piano at the Conservatoire de Bordeaux and devotes herself essentially to chamber music.

Instrumentist 
She plays regularly as a soloist under the baton of Hans Graf, Jean-Jacques Kantorow, Philippe Bender, in Europe and Japan. She is invited alongside Laurent Korcia, Renaud Capuçon, Jean-Jacques Kantorow, Tasso Adamopoulos in Asia, Russia, and participates in the chamber music seasons of the 

She is invited in festivals in Europe as in Montepulciano (Hans Werner Henze), as well as in Asia (Hong Kong, Beijing, Wuhan, Tokyo, Kyoto), the USA (New York, San Francisco) etc.

At the same time, she is a chamber musician, performing with Renaud Capuçon, Laurent Korcia, Marielle Nordmann, Patrice Fontanarosa and the Bordeaux quartet (Stéphane Rougier, Cécile Rouvière, Tasso Adamopoulos and Étienne Péclard) with whom she will tour Russia in the framework of the 2010 France-Russia year with the Bordeaux delegation in the presence of Alain Juppé.

Dedicatee in 2012 of Snekkar de Feu for violin, piano and narrator on a text by Michel Onfray and a music by Pierre Thilloy, she participated in the premiere of the work at the 37th Cantiere Internazionale d’Arte di Montepulciano.

In addition, Teboul plays with the London Tango Quintet with Juan José Mosalini as well as with the "Meshouge Klezmer Band" and has recorded several CDs:
 My Beloved Composers, works by Gabriel Fauré and Isaac Albeniz, 1999, oki - USA, ;
 Au bonheur des Dames (music of the Roaring Twenties), September 2010,  ;
 Musique Klezmer with the "Meshouge Klezmer Band", 2010.

For several years, she has performed in concerts of the Opéra national de Bordeaux in registers as different as classical music, contemporary music, tango or Klezmer music; for example, in 2007 (classical and contemporary music works) in 2009 (concert Tango) in 2011 (works by Astor Piazzolla) in 2013 (works by Bruckner and Klezmer music) in 2014 (classical music pieces).

References

External links 
 www.sophieteboul.com Official website
 Sophie Teboul : Impromptu de Franz Schubert (YouTube)

21st-century French women classical pianists
Conservatoire de Paris alumni
Musicians from Nice
1976 births
Living people